Marius Ebbers (born 4 January 1978) is a German former professional footballer who played as a forward. He works as assistant manager of SC Victoria.

Playing career
Ebbers scored 108 goals in the Bundesliga and 2. Bundesliga, the first two levels of the German football league system. He played for a couple of months abroad in 2014 - at Fort Lauderdale Strikers in the North American Soccer League.

Coaching career
Ebbers retired in June 2017, and was immediately hired as assistant manager of the club he last played for, SC Victoria. He left his position one year. However, he re-joined his position again in January 2019, when his former teammate from FC St. Pauli, Fabian Boll, became the new manager of the club.

Outside football
Ebbers owns Ebb & Flow, a clothing store in Hamburg. He started a "relief campaign for the homeless."

References

External links
 
 

1978 births
Living people
German footballers
Footballers from Essen
Association football forwards
MSV Duisburg players
SG Wattenscheid 09 players
1. FC Köln players
Alemannia Aachen players
FC St. Pauli players
VfL 93 Hamburg players
Fort Lauderdale Strikers players
Bundesliga players
2. Bundesliga players
North American Soccer League players
German expatriate footballers
German expatriate sportspeople in the United States
Expatriate soccer players in the United States